This is an list of notable Bhojpuri singers. These vocal artists are from India and Nepal; some belong to the immigrant population living abroad in the Netherlands, North America, South America and Africa.

List

 Alka Yagnik
 Alok Kumar
 Arjun Sharma
 Asha Bhosale
 Chandan Tiwari
 Damodar Raao
 Dinesh Lal Yadav
 Dropati
 Indu Sonali
 Kalpana Patowary
 Khesari Lal Yadav
 Kishore Kumar
 Kumar Sanu
 Lata Mangeshkar
 Malini Awasthi
 Manoj Tiwari
 Mohammed Rafi
 Mika Singh
 Pawan Singh
 Raj Mohan
 Ramdew Chaitoe
 Ritesh Pandey
 Samuel Singh
 Sharda Sinha
 Shreya Ghoshal
 Sonu Nigam
 Udit Narayan
 Ramdew Chaitoe
 Alok Kumar
 Raj Mohan
 Ritesh Pandey
 Kalpana Patowary
 Priyanka Singh
 Poornima
 Damodar Raao
 Mohan Rathod
 Indu Sonali
 Pawan Singh
 Samuel Singh
 Chandan Tiwari
 Manoj Tiwari
 Dinesh Lal Yadav
 Khesari Lal Yadav
 Samar Singh
 Neelkamal Singh
 Rakesh Mishra
 Neha Singh Rathore

See also
Bhojpuri cinema
List of Bhojpuri people
List of Bhojpuri actors
List of Bhojpuri actresses

References

Music-related lists
Bhojpuri singers
Singers
Indian folk music